is a Japanese folk band, created from two members of the 1970s novelty group  ,  and . They are best known for their collaboration with the eight-year-old singer Nozomi Ōhashi for the theme song of the Studio Ghibli film Ponyo.

Biography

Former bandmates Takaaki Fujioka and Naoya Fujimaki decided they wanted to form a unit together in 2003. Originally it was titled , however from the advice from their friend AKB48 producer Yasushi Akimoto shortened it. The duo debuted under SME Records in 2006 with the single "Yoroketa Hyōshi ni Tachiagare!." The duo released two solo singles and two albums between 2006 and 2007, however none of these charted on Oricon's charts.

Since then, the group have collaborated with several artists for musical releases. They have written a song for AA-Chino, "Hayaku Koikoi Wrecker-sha," duetted with Country Musume member Mai Satoda on her first single released for the variety show Quiz! Hexagon II, and wrote a song sung by Aya Matsuura for a FamilyMart commercial, .

Their greatest success came from duetting with then eight-year-old Nozomi Ōhashi for the Studio Ghibli film Ponyo. The song was a massive success, reaching #3 on Oricon's single charts, topped the RIAJ ringtone download chart for a month, and won a special award at the 50th Japan Record Awards.

The group went on hiatus between November 2008 and January 2009 due to Fujioka's ill health.

Discography

Albums

Singles

Other appearances

References

External links 
 Official site 
 Official blog 
 Sony label site 

Japanese musical duos
Sony Music Entertainment Japan artists
Musical groups established in 2003
2003 establishments in Japan
Musical groups from Tokyo